Gustavo Adolfo "El chichis" Infante Seañez (born April 14, 1965) is a Mexican TV host, best known for his collaborations in Grupo Imagen and the Spanish-language television network Univision. He was the host for De Primera Mano and previously hosted Sale el Sol's entertainment-segment Pajaros en el Alambre.

References 

1965 births
Living people
Mexican television journalists
Mexican journalists
Television journalists